Maria Yurievna Abashova is a Russian ballerina who is principal dancer at the Eifman Ballet, St. Petersburg. She studied at St. Pölten Ballet Conservatory, Austria.

Abashova excelled and became acknowledged by critics in Anna's part in Anna Karenina ballet by Boris Eifman.
Built like an imperial Borzoi, Maria Abashova, as Anna, is eye riveting every moment she is on stage. Choreography that made the most of her physical attributes allowed her time and again to extend a line from fingertip to toe that seemed to stretch on forever. Voluminous skirted costumes reminiscent of Martha Graham's fluid jerseys, abetted the illusion of endless leg.

Awards
2002 : Golden medal (women, classical dance) of the Youth America Grand Prix competition, New York City
2006 : Zolotaya maska award for role of Anna Karenina in Anna Karenina by Boris Eifman 
2007 : Zolotoy sofit award for role of Nina Zarechnaya in Chayka by Boris Eifman

References

1983 births
Living people
Russian ballerinas
Principal dancers
21st-century Russian dancers